The Thornycroft family was a notable English family of sculptors, artists and engineers, connected by marriage to the historic Sassoon family. The earliest known mention of the family is stated in George Ormerod's History of Cheshire as during the reign of Henry III in the 13th century, taking its name from a Cheshire hamlet. Sir John Isaac Thornycroft (1843–1928) was the founder of the Thornycroft shipbuilding company.

References

External links 

 
 Photographs of All Saints, Siddington, Cheshire, England, UK - has early history of the family tree and 18th-century family tree

 
Sassoon family